The Finnish Figure Skating Championship was awarded in five events in 1939.

Men's single skating 

Competed in Helsinki on 26 February 1939.

Source:

Women's single skating 

Competed in Tampere on 12 February 1939.

Source:

Boys' single skating 

Won by Aarne Ellilä.

Girls' single skating 

Competed in Hämeenlinna on 4–5 February 1939.

Source:

Pair skating 

Competed in Helsinki on 26 February 1939.

Source:

Sources

References 

Finnish Figure Skating Championships
1939 in figure skating
1939 in Finnish sport